Scopula timboensis is a moth of the  family Geometridae. It is found in Brazil.

References

Moths described in 1938
timboensis
Moths of South America